In enzymology, a fatty-acid peroxidase is an enzyme that catalyzes the chemical reaction

palmitate + 2 H2O2  pentadecanal + CO2 + 3 H2O

Thus, the two substrates of this enzyme are palmitate and H2O2, whereas its 3 products are pentadecanal, CO2, and H2O.

This enzyme belongs to the family of oxidoreductases, specifically those acting on a peroxide as acceptor (peroxidases).  The systematic name of this enzyme class is hexadecanoate:hydrogen-peroxide oxidoreductase. This enzyme is also called long chain fatty acid peroxidase.

References

 

EC 1.11.1
Enzymes of unknown structure